PMCH might refer to:
 Patna Medical College and Hospital
 Melanin-concentrating hormone, which official gene name is PMCH